Qasr-e Shirin County is in Kermanshah province, Iran. The capital of the county is the city of Qasr-e Shirin. At the 2006 census, the county's population was 19,821 in 4,999 households. The following census in 2011 counted 25,517 people in 6,058 households. At the 2016 census, the county's population was 23,929 in 6,903 households.

Administrative divisions

The population history of Qasr-e Shirin County's administrative divisions over three consecutive censuses is shown in the following table. The latest census shows two districts, four rural districts, and two cities.

See also
Sarpol-e Zahab County
Gilan-e Gharb County

References

 

Counties of Kermanshah Province